ShareASale is an affiliate marketing network based in the River North neighborhood in Chicago, IL USA.  ShareASale services two customer sets in affiliate marketing: the affiliate, and the merchant.

Affiliates use ShareASale to find products to promote, and earn commission for referrals on those products.  Affiliates use their own website, blogs, social media, PPC campaigns, SEO campaigns, RSS and email,  as well as a number of other means.

Merchants use ShareASale to implement, track, and manage their affiliate program.

Company history
ShareASale was founded in 2000 by Brian Littleton, and to date has over 16550 merchant programs hosted on its network platform. ShareASale is primarily targeting small and mid-size merchants. ShareASale is among the largest U.S. affiliate networks in terms of number of advertisers who are using an affiliate network to manage their affiliate program.

After many years with the company Brian and Michael Littleton left in 2018.

Ownership
ShareASale was a privately held Chicago, Illinois; USA Corporation when it was founded in 2000.

ShareASale was acquired by Awin that is part of Axel Springer Group on June, 10th 2017 for an undisclosed amount.

See also
Affiliate Networks
Affiliate marketing

References

External links
ShareASale Company Website

Companies based in Chicago
Online advertising services and affiliate networks
Companies established in 2000
Affiliate marketing